Michał Wiśniowiecki or Mykhailo Vyshnevetsky (1529–1584) was a Ruthenian noble (szlachcic) of Polish–Lithuanian Commonwealth. He was a prince at Wiśniowiec, magnate, Senior of Registered Cossacks, Hetman of Zaporozhian Cossacks, castellan of Bracław and Kijów (Kyiv or Kiev), starost of Czerkasy, Kaniów, Lubeka and Łojów. Great-grandfather of the future King of Poland, Michał Korybut Wiśniowiecki.

Wisnowiecki was born before the Union of Lublin in the Grand Duchy of Lithuania.

Marriage and issue
Michał married Halszka Zenowiczówna h. Deszpot and had five children

 Aleksander Wiśniowiecki (ca. 1560–1594), starost of Czerkasy, Kaniów, Korsuń Szewczenkowski, Lubeka and Łojów, married Helena Jełowiecka h. Jełowiecki
 Michał Wiśniowiecki (died 1616), married Regina Mohyła, father of Jeremi Wiśniowiecki, grandfather of King Michał Korybut Wiśniowiecki
 Jerzy Wiśniowiecki (died 1618), married Teodora Czaplica h. Kierdeja
 Maryna Wiśniowiecka, married Teodor ks. Drucki-Horski h. Druck	 
 Zofia Wiśniowiecka (1595 – died after 1612), married Jerzy Ostafi Tyszkiewicz h. Leliwa

See also
 List of szlachta

Bibliography
 Filip Sulimierski, Bronisław Chlebowski, Władysław Walewski, Słownik geograficzny Królestwa Polskiego i innych krajów słowiańskich, t. V, Warszawa, 1880–1902, s. 36.

References

1529 births
1584 deaths
Michal Wisniowiecki 1529
Secular senators of the Polish–Lithuanian Commonwealth